Paweł Wiktor Graliński (born 10 January 1961, Warsaw) is a Polish architect, specializing in planning and design of mixed-use developments and commercial and entertainment centres in Poland and Europe.

Life and career 
Graliński graduated from the Faculty of Architecture at the Warsaw University of Technology in 1984. During his studies, his work was by the Polish Academy of Sciences. He was involved in anti-communist opposition.

In 1984, he moved to Oslo, Norway. From 1986, he led the design office "Andersen, Larsson, Graliński AS", and he founded his own design studio in 1988. His contribution was in shopping centres at the turn of eighties and nineties in Scandinavia. He also designed insurance company headquarters, office buildings, coastal land developments, housing, redevelopment projects and residential sites.

In 1996, he was invited to design Sadyba Best Mall in Warsaw. In 1997 he founded his own architectural firm in Poland: Paweł W. Graliński Arch Magic Assoc. Architects, dealing with investment projects and real estate development. Graliński designed entertainment projects, university buildings, offices, industrial areas, and residential areas.

Graliński belongs to the Association of Norwegian Architects, the Chamber of Architects, the Engineers Chamber of the Republic of Poland, and the Association of Polish Architects.

He lives outside of Warsaw in a house of his own design, cultivates a vineyard and breeds race dogs.

Awards and prizes 

In 2002, Sadyba Best Mall in Warsaw, which he designed, was recognised by the International Council of Shopping Centers (ICSC) for its design. It was the first ICSC award for a project in Central and Eastern Europe regions.

He was further recognised for:

The most beautiful office building (Viking House, 2000, the prize by the Mayor of Warsaw, District of Ursynów)
 Building of the Year (Punkt 44 entertainment centre in Katowice, Silesia, Poland, 2002, the prize by the Polish Association of Construction Engineers)
 Interior of the Year (Cinema City Toruń, 2004, the Pomerania Marshal award.

Selected projects 

 Vinterbro Center, Vinterbro, Norway, 1994
 Viking House, Warsaw, 2000
 Sadyba Best Mall, Warsaw, 2000 (first 3D IMAX® theatre in Poland)
 Punkt 44, Katowice (entertainment centre: cinema Multiplex & IMAX®, bowling), 2003
 Cinema City, Toruń, 2004
 Horse Race Apartments, Warsaw, 2005
 Cinema City (IMAX) Manufaktura, Łódź, 2005
 Cinema City Arkadia, Warsaw, 2006
 private residency, Konstancin-Jeziorna, 2006
 Focus Mall, shopping centre, Piła, project
 Centrum Nowych Technologii I (CENT I) University of Warsaw, 2013
 Faculty of Psychology University of Warsaw, project
 Vogla square, Warsaw– Wilanów, project

External links 

 Arch Magic – official site
 New Technologies Centre, Warsaw University
 interview with Paweł Graliński
 Paweł Graliński about commercial centres
 Psychology faculty, Warsaw University

1961 births
Living people
Architects from Warsaw